or  is a palace in the suburbs of Mantua, Italy. It is a fine example of the mannerist style of architecture, and the acknowledged masterpiece of Giulio Romano. Although formed in Italian, the usual name in English of Palazzo del Te is not that now used by Italians. The English name arises because the art historian, Vasari, calls it the "", and English-speaking writers, especially art historians, still most often call it "Palazzo del Te".

History 
Palazzo del Te was constructed 1524–34 for Federico II Gonzaga, Marquess of Mantua, as a palace of leisure.

Giulio Romano, a pupil of Raphael, was commissioned to design the building. The shell of the palazzo, erected within eighteen months, is basically a square house containing a cloistered courtyard.

Once the shell of the building was completed, for ten years a team of plasterers, carvers, and fresco painters laboured until barely a surface in any of the loggias or salons remained undecorated. Under Romano's direction, local decorative painters such as Benedetto Pagni and Rinaldo Mantovano worked extensively on the frescos.

In July 1630, during the War of the Mantuan Succession (1628–31), Mantua and the palace were sacked over three days by an Imperial army of 36,000 Landsknecht mercenaries. The remaining populace fell victim to one of the worst plagues in history that the invaders had brought with them. The Palazzo was looted from top to bottom and remained an empty shell with nymphs, gods, goddesses, and giants adorning the walls of the empty, echoing rooms.

Description 

Like the Villa Farnesina in Rome, the suburban location allowed for a mixing of both palace and villa architecture. The East façade differs from the other three by having Palladian motifs on its pilaster and an open loggia at its centre rather than an arch to the courtyard. The facades are not so symmetrical as they appear and the spans between the columns are irregular. The centers of the North and South facades are pierced by two-storey arches without portico or pediment, simply a covered way leading to the interior courtyard.

The frescoes are the most remarkable feature of the Palazzo.
These magnificent rooms, once furnished to complement the ducal court of the Gonzaga family, saw many of the most illustrious figures of their era entertained, such as the Emperor Charles V, who, when visiting in 1530, elevated his host Federico II of Gonzaga from Marquess to Duke of Mantua.

It contains a collection of Mesopotamian art.

Gallery

References 

Summerson, John, The Classical Language of Architecture, 1980 edition, Thames and Hudson World of Art series,

External links 

 Official website
 Mantua tourist guide
 Palazzo Te at Google Arts & Culture

Giulio Romano buildings
Houses completed in 1534
Te
Renaissance architecture in Mantua
Fresco paintings in Mantua
Mannerist architecture in Italy
Historic house museums in Italy
Egyptological collections in Italy
Numismatic museums in Italy
Art museums and galleries in Lombardy
1534 establishments in the Holy Roman Empire
Museums in Mantua
Gonzaga residences
Loggias in Italy